The Roscrea brooch is a 9th-century Celtic brooch of the pseudo-penannular type, found at or near Roscrea, County Tipperary, Ireland, before 1829. It is made from cast silver, and decorated with zoomorphic patterns of open-jawed animals and gilded gold filigree, and is 9.5 cm in height and 8.3 cm wide. The silver is of an unusually high quality for Irish metalwork of the period, indicating that its craftsmen were both trading materials with settled Vikings, who had first, traumatically, invaded the island in the preceding century, and had absorbed elements of the Scandinavian's imagery and metalwork techniques.

It was rediscovered in the 1820s and was in the possession of the artist and antiquarian George Petrie in 1850, until acquired in 1867 by the Royal Irish Academy, Dublin, following his death the previous year. Although not considered as innovative and significant as near contemporary examples, such as the Tara Brooch, it is formed from unusually high quality material, including first grade silver and its linings of amber, which was very difficult to source in Ireland at the time.

Replicas of the brooch became popular from the mid-19th century Celtic Revival, some of which are of a high quality. Despite the loss of some of its bosses, is in overall good condition, and is today in the collection of the National Museum of Ireland, Dublin.

Dating
The brooch is variously dated as from the early (Mitchell) to late (O'Toole/NMI) 9th century. Writing in 1983, historian Micheal Ryan gave a probable dating of the mid to late-9th century, and Henderson notes that its zoomorphic iconography has parallels with Scottish designs of that period.

The brooch, and the 8th century Book of Dimma found at Roscrea Abbey, and Stowe Missal from the nearby village of Lorrha, indicate the relative prosperity of the town during the period. In 1993, the historian Orna Somerville noted how, by the 8th century, brooch rings such as the current example and those found in the Hill of Tara and at Killamery, "had ceased to be functional and was primarily a vehicle for elaborate decoration".

Description

The brooch is of the pseudo-penannular type (i.e. the ring is fully closed, but has two separately defined terminals). It weighs  122.85 grams, and is 9.5 cm high and 8.3 cm wide, and is made from cast silver, amber and gold. The brooch has an overall lozenge shape, with a large flat triangular head and crest of rounded compartments decorated with gold filigree. The 8 cm long pin emerges through the mouth of a basal animal, and is attached to both the front and back sides of the plate. The pinhead contains pairs of concentric relief rings decorated with filigree. Both the pinhead and plate are decorated with rows of dots. The three main panels are also decorated with filigree, The outer edges of the terminals contain a pair of animals separated by an amber stud on the terminal's outer edges. Their bodies are co-joined from the area around their tails, a motif also found in a brooch found in Derryloughan, County Tyrone and in the 8th- or 9th-century  Derrynaflan Chalice.

Its depictions of animals are of both the Tara (c. 710–750 AD) type strap-like (flat) and Killamery Brooch (9th century) tube-like body (rounded) forms, and is thus considered to be a transitional work between these two periods. The animals are in places open-jawed, and generally are positioned in rectangular panels and given rounded, ribbon-like bodies.

Only three of the seven large hemispherical amber bosses (raised circular ornamental studs) are intact; one been lost and three are badly damaged. It originally had twenty-four in-filled D-shaped panels, of which, according to historian Niamh Whitfield: "eleven were D-shaped amber studs alternating with filigree, except at the top of the pinhead, where all four D-shaped panels contained filigree. Of these D-shaped amber studs, however, a fragment of just one survives at the edge of the right terminal."

Although its design is not as refined or sophisticated as other contemporary Irish brooches, and has been described "crude" compared to the similar Tara Brooch, the Roscrea Brooch is highly ornate and its material is of a very high quality. In 2013 it was described by  writer Fintan O'Toole as "distinctively Irish" when he selected it for his book A History of Ireland in 100 Objects, co-published by the Irish Times and Royal Irish Academy. O'Toole wrote that the object's "abstract patterns and elongated animals are typical of basic forms of Irish visual art" and that "there is as much continuity here as there is innovation."

The influence of contact with recent Viking invaders is evident in two ways, most notably from its composition from high quality silver, which would have been near impossible to source locally. In addition, amber could only be sourced from Scandinavia or the Baltic region, and is rarely found in Irish metalwork before the 9th century. Both these facts indicate that its workmen were able to trade with the invading Norsemen. In addition, a number of large bosses contain Viking-influenced designs, including of kite shaped brooches and depictions of thistles.

Find-spot and provenance

It was in the possession of the artist, antiquarian and artifact dealer George Petrie by 1850. A number of recent historians, including Stephen Briggs, doubt Petrie's claim that the find-spot was in Roscrea town, and view Petrie's claim as motivated towards increasing the objects market value. Briggs claimed that Petrie was "unfussy about his acquisitions’ provenances and that during the 1850s he appeared willing to invent an appropriate find-spot for his brooch, probably to help market its replicas", although he clarifies that Petrie was a "meticulous scholar whose abilities and research practices are not here in question". Most historians do however believe it was at least found in a location not far outside Roscrea, although Briggs speculates that it is the same brooch mentioned in an 1829 newspaper article which mentions a similarly described brooch recently discovered alongside a hoard of coins in Rathkeale, located some 100 km from Roscrea.

It was acquired in 1867 by the Royal Irish Academy, Dublin, as part of a larger purchase of Petrie's entire collection, following his death the previous year. It is today on permanent display in the Treasury room of the National Museum of Ireland in Dublin.

References

Citations

Sources 

 Bourke, Cormac. "A Crozier and Bell from Inishmurray and Their Place in Ninth-Century Irish Archaeology". Proceedings of the Royal Irish Academy: Archaeology, Culture, History, Literature, volume 85C, 1985. 
 Briggs, Stephen. "The Roscrea Brooch Re-Provenanced?". Ulster Journal of Archaeology, volume 74, 2017. 
 Graham-Campbell, James. "Two Groups of Ninth-Century Irish Brooches". The Journal of the Royal Society of Antiquaries of Ireland, volume 102, no. 2 1972. 
 Henderson, George; Henderson, Isabel. The Art of the Picts, Sculpture and Metalwork in Early Medieval Scotland. London: Thames & Hudson, 2004. 
 Kelly, Eamonn. "A Prehistoric Amber Find from Ballylin, Co. Offaly". Journal of the Roscrea Heritage Society, no. 2, 1983–84
 McCrum, Elizabeth. "Irish Victorian Jewellery". Irish Arts Review (1984-1987), nolume 2, no. 1, Spring, 1985. 
 Mitchell, Frank (ed.). Treasures of Early Irish Art, 1500 B.C. to 1500 A.D. NY: Metropolitan Museum of Art, 2013. 
 Moss, Rachel. Medieval c. 400—c. 1600: Art and Architecture of Ireland. Yale University Press, 2014. 
 Ó Floinn, Raghnall. Treasures of the National Museum of Ireland: Irish Antiquities. Dublin: Gill & Macmillan, 2002
 O'Toole, Fintan.  A History of Ireland in 100 Objects. Dublin: Royal Irish Academy, 2013. 
 Ryan, Micheal. Ireland and Insular Art, A.D.500-1200: Conference Proceedings.  Dublin: Royal Irish Academy, 1987. 
 Ryan, Micheal. Treasures of Ireland: Irish Art, 3000 B.C.-1500 A.D.. Dublin: Royal Irish Academy, 1983. 
 Somerville, Orna. "Kite-Shaped Brooches". Journal of the Royal Society of Antiquaries of Ireland, volume 123, 1993. 
 Stout, Matthew. "Ringforts in the South-West Midlands of Ireland". Proceedings of the Royal Irish Academy: Archaeology, Culture, History, Literature, volume 91C, 1991. 
 Whitfield, Niamh. "Celtic Filigree from the Seventh to the Ninth Century AD with Particular Reference to that on Brooches", volume 3 (Three volume PHD thesis, quoted in Briggs, 2017). University of London, 1990
 Young, Susan (ed). The Work of Angels: Masterpieces of Celtic Metalwork, 6th–9th centuries AD. London: British Museum Press, 1989. 

Celtic brooches
Collection of the National Museum of Ireland
History of County Tipperary
Medieval European metalwork objects
Silver-gilt objects